The NJCAA Division I women's basketball championship is an American intercollegiate basketball tournament conducted by the National Junior College Athletic Association (NJCAA), and determines the Division I women's national champion.  The current champion is Tyler Junior College who defeated Georgia Highlands on 3.21.22 to capture the 2022 Championship. The tournament has been held since 1975. The most successful program, Trinity Valley Community College, has won the tournament eight times, including three straight championships from 2012-2015. From 1998-2014, the tournament was hosted at Bicentennial Center in Salina, Kansas. Since 2016, the tournament is held at Rip Griffin Center, on the campus of former NJCAA member Lubbock Christian University, in Lubbock, Texas.

Format
The tournament consists of 24 teams with 8 teams receiving a bye in the first round.

Championships

See also
 NAIA Women's Basketball Championships
 NCAA Women's Division I Basketball Championship
 NJCAA Men's Division I Basketball Championship

References

External links
 Official website